Julieta Cardinali (born October 21, 1977) is an Argentine film and television actress.

Career 
Julieta Cardinali began her career in television as the first non-brazilian Paquita at argentinian version of the television show El show de Xuxa hosted by Xuxa. In 1995, she was part of the television program staff of Jugate con todo hosted by Cris Morena. In 1996, she was part of the cast of the television series Montaña rusa, otra vuelta. In 1997, she was part of the cast of the television series Sueltos. In 1997, she was part of the cast of the television series Como pan caliente. In 1997, she was part of the cast of the television series Naranja y media. In 1997, she was part of the cast of the television series Socios y más. In 1998, she was part of the cast of the television series Lo dijo papá. In 1998, she made her film debut, with the movie Buenos Aires me mata. From 1998 to 2000, she was part of the cast of the youth television series Verano del '98. In 2000, she acted in the movie Una noche con Sabrina Love. In 2001, she was part of the cast of the television series Los médicos de hoy. In 2001, she was part of the cast of the television series EnAmorArte. In 2001, she makes a small participation in the television series  El Hacker 2001. In 2002, she was part of the cast of the television series Máximo corazón. In 2002, she was part of the cast of the television series Tiempo final. In 2002, she was part of the cast of the television series Maridos a domicilio. In 2002, she acted in the movie Valentín. In 2003, she was part of the cast of the television series Malandras. In 2003, she was part of the cast of the television series Disputas. In 2003, she acted in the movie El Nominado. In 2004, she was part of the cast of the television series Sangre fría. In 2004, she acted in the movie Un mundo menos peor. In 2005, she was part of the cast of the television series Numeral 15. In 2005, she acted in the movie Un Buda. In 2005, she acted in the movie La Suerte está echada. In 2006, she was part of the cast of the television series El tiempo no para. In 2006, she was part of the cast of the television series Soy tu fan. In 2007, she acted in the movie La Antena. In 2007, she acted in the movie ¿De quién es el portaligas?. In 2008, she acted in the movie 14, Fabian Road. In 2009, she was part of the cast of the television series Rosa, Violeta y Celeste. In 2009, she acted in the movie Tres deseos. In 2009, she acted in the movie El reclamo. In 2010, she was part of the cast of the television series Caín y Abel. In 2011, she was part of the cast of the television series Proyecto Aluvión. In 2012, she was part of the cast of the television series En terapia. In 2012, she acted in the movie Una cita, una fiesta y un gato negro. In 2013, she was part of the cast of the television series Farsantes. In 2013, she was the protagonist of the Spanish miniseries Carta a Eva. In 2013, she was part of the cast of the television series Lynch. In 2013, she acted in the movie Lectura según Justino. In 2014, she was part of the cast of the television series Señores Papis. In 2014, she acted in the movie Necrofobia. In 2014, she acted in the movie Los del suelo. In 2014, she acted in the movie El amor y otras historias. In 2015, she was part of the cast of the television series Viudas e hijos del Rock and Roll. In 2016, she was part of the cast of the television series Los ricos no piden permiso. In 2016, she was part of the cast of the television series Ultimátum. In 2016, she acted in the movie Ataúd blanco. In 2017, she acted in the movie Casi leyendas. In 2018, she was part of the cast of the television series Edha.

Personal life 
On  July 23, 2010, she married Andrés Calamaro, whom was her boyfriend for 5 years. On January 9, 2007, she gave birth to the couple's first child, a girl, whom they called Charo Calamaro Cardinali. The couple divorced in 2011.

Filmography

Television

Television Programs

Movies

Theater

Awards and nominations

References

External links
 
 
 Julieta Cardinali interview at La Nación by Gabriela Navarra 

1977 births
Actresses from Buenos Aires
Argentine film actresses
Living people